Juliet Jobling-Purser (born 2 March 1943) is an Irish equestrian. She competed in two events at the 1968 Summer Olympics.

References

External links
 

1943 births
Living people
Irish female equestrians
Olympic equestrians of Ireland
Equestrians at the 1968 Summer Olympics
Sportspeople from Newcastle upon Tyne